Robina Fordyce Cowper (18 August 1866 – 3 August 1948) was an Australian women's rights activist, magistrate and temperance advocate.

Early life 
Cowper was the eldest of twelve children born to Mary (née Fordyce) and John Inglis. She was educated at Clarendon College, Ballarat. In 1884 she matriculated from the University of Melbourne in the Modern Languages class.

Marriage 
On 10 January 1891 she married Charles William Cowper. Her father officiated at the ceremony. Robina and Charles had one daughter, Mary Inglis Cowper (known as May) who was born in 1892 and died aged 3 years and 8 months, in 1895.

Activism 
Cowper campaigned for more women in the police force, and for the inclusion of women in church leadership.

Cowper was an active member of the Collins Street Independent Church and was the first woman on the executive of the Congregational Union committee. She was also a founding member of executive of the Congregational Women's Association.

In 1928, Cowper was appointed as a special magistrate of the Children's Court, Melbourne.

References 

1866 births
1948 deaths
University of Melbourne alumni
Australian women's rights activists
People from Victoria (Australia)